Jozef Jankech is a Slovak football coach. He was the second manager of the Slovak national team.

Playing career
Jankech began with football in his native town Šaľa. He played for Šaľa from the age of ten, later he left to play for Uherské Hradiště, then played for TTS Trenčín and he ended his career in TŽ Třinec as 29 years old. The first club in which he started coaching was TŽ Třinec. His playing career was not as successful as his coaching career.

Managing career
Jankech was one of the few Slovak football globetrotters. He trained in foreign several exotic teams such as Kuala Lumpur, Qatar Sports Club or twice in national team of Maldives. Jankech starting his managerial career as ending player in Czech team TŽ Třinec. Then followed stage in Košice where he trained at first VSS Košice and then Lokomotíva Košice. In 1980 coming the first foreign job in Cyprian team Nea Salamina Larnaka. Jankech also trained Czechoslovakia olympic team. Meanwhile, he was coach in TTS Trenčín.

On 4 July 1995 he became the second Slovak football trainer after Jozef Vengloš. Jankech completed two qualification cycles, first for Euro 96 and second for the 1998 World Cup. He achieved several very good results against strong opponents such as victories over Czech Republic, Poland and Croatia at the friendly match and draws against France and Yugoslavia. He failed to progress at the championship.

Jankech won SAFF Championship in 2008 with Maldives. It was the best success of Maldivian national team in history.

In December 2008 Jankech moved to Dukla Banská Bystrica.

Honour
He was also a part in a Czech online football manager BREJK, where he was a pro bono 100% (best in game) couch for 15 days for a winner of brejktip, quiz in that manager. He was there nicknamed as Jozef Hlavatý.
picture from game

Honours

Manager
Lokomotíva Košice
Czechoslovak Cup: 1977, 1979

Slovan Bratislava
2. liga: Runners-up: 2005-06 (Promoted)

Maldives
SAFF Championship: 2008

References

Living people
ŠK Slovan Bratislava managers
1937 births
Czechoslovak footballers
TTS Trenčín players
Slovak football managers
Slovak expatriate football managers
Slovakia national football team managers
Maldives national football team managers
Czechoslovak football managers
FK Inter Bratislava managers
MŠK Žilina managers
FC VSS Košice managers
FK Dukla Banská Bystrica managers
Sportspeople from Šaľa
Qatar SC managers
Expatriate football managers in Qatar
Czechoslovak expatriate sportspeople in Cyprus
Czechoslovak expatriate sportspeople in Malaysia
Expatriate football managers in Malaysia
Expatriate football managers in the Maldives
Expatriate football managers in Cyprus
Slovak expatriate sportspeople in Malaysia
Slovak expatriate sportspeople in the Maldives
Slovak expatriate sportspeople in Qatar
FC Lokomotíva Košice managers
FK Fotbal Třinec managers
FK Dubnica managers
Association football wingers
Kuala Lumpur City F.C. managers